Arne Isacsson (21 March 1917 – 25 September 2010) was one of Sweden's most famous watercolour artists and art educators. He was also an author and professor and founded the Gerlesborg School of Fine Art in 1944. Isacsson's well-represented oeuvre explored, among other things, the properties of colour pigments in copious amounts of water.

Biography 
Arne Isacsson was born in Ronneby, Sweden. His grandparents had emigrated from Dalsland to South Bend, Indiana, United States, but returned in the late 19th century. His father enlisted, but had returned to work as a mill worker in Ronneby at the time of Isacsson's birth. A few years later, the family moved to Södermalm in Stockholm and in 1930 to Gothenburg, where Isacsson graduated in 1935.

He was a student of artist  from 1944 to 1946.

Isacsson was the originator of the watercolour monotyping technique and used it, among other things, in collages that were laminated between panes of glass. He is represented at the Nationalmuseum with a portrait of Vilhelm Moberg, the National Portrait Gallery at Gripsholm, the Swedish Parliament, the Centre Culturel Suédois in Paris, the Gothenburg Museum of Art, and more.

Isacsson was the founder of the Gerlesborg School of Fine Art in Gerlesborg (1944), eventually with branches in Stockholm (1948) and Provence (1958), and was appointed professor of watercolour technique in 1983. He is the author of several books on watercolour techniques.

In 2004 the biography  by Gertrud Gidlund and Göran Gustafsson was published. In 2008, a lavishly illustrated licentiate thesis was published:  by Anita Midbjer at Umeå University.

Isacsson was married from 1947 to 1958 to teacher Kerstin Renqvist (1922–2009), sister of artist ; from 1958 to 1965 to actress  (1927–1992); and from 1966 until his death to artist  (born 1943). His children include Swedish-Canadian filmmaker Magnus Isacsson (1948–2012) from his first marriage. Arne Isacsson died in 2010 in Gerlesborg and is buried at Laxarby Cemetery.

Awards 
In 1970 Isacsson received the Svea Life Guards' merit badge from King Gustaf VI Adolf. He received an honorary doctorate from Umeå University in 2004.

Bibliography

Works represented at 

 Nationalmuseum
 National Portrait Gallery at Gripsholm
 
 Gothenburg Museum of Art
 Museum of Bohuslän
 
 Centre Culturel Suédois in Paris
 Nordic Watercolour Museum

References

Obituary - Svenska Dagbladet (Swedish)

1917 births
2010 deaths
People from Ronneby Municipality
20th-century Swedish painters
21st-century Swedish painters
Swedish watercolourists
Recipients of the Illis quorum